Roland de Mois (c.1520 - 1593) was a Flemish painter of the Spanish Renaissance. He was born in Brussels and was active in Aragon from 1559 onwards, having been summoned there with Pablo Esquert by Martín de Gurrea y Aragón, Duke of Villahermosa. He died in Zaragoza.

1520 births
1593 deaths
16th-century Flemish painters
Flemish Renaissance painters
Artists from Brussels